William Grant Broughton (22 May 178820 February 1853) was an Anglican bishop. He was the first (and only) Bishop of Australia of the Church of England.  The then Diocese of Australia, has become the Anglican Church of Australia and is divided into twenty three dioceses.

Early years

Broughton was born in the City of Westminster, England. He was educated first at Queen Elizabeth's School, Barnet, then at The King's School, Canterbury, where he was a King's scholar. His fortunes turned from commerce to theology when he inherited a substantial sum, allowing him to study at Pembroke College, Cambridge. He graduated Bachelor of Arts (BA) as 6th wrangler in 1818 and was married 13 July that year to Sarah Francis (herself daughter of a priest, John Francis of Canterbury) at Canterbury Cathedral. Per tradition, he proceeded Master of Arts (MA Cantab.) five years later in 1823. He was ordained deacon on 15 February 1818 and priest on 17 May the same year, both times by John Fisher (bishop of Salisbury), at the Quebec Chapel, Marylebone (but on behalf of Brownlow North, Bishop of Winchester, in whose diocese Broughton served); he became a curate in Hampshire and later in Surrey where he was noticed by Arthur Wellesley, 1st Duke of Wellington, who materially assisted his prospects, including influence in Broughton being offered the Archdeaconry of Sydney.

Colony of New South Wales

Broughton arrived in Sydney on 13 September 1829, succeeding Thomas Scott as Archdeacon of New South Wales (that at the time substantially encompassed what is now the states of New South Wales plus Queensland to the north and Victoria to the south) three days later, 16 September. At this time, the colony was ecclesiastically an archdeaconry of the Anglican Diocese of Calcutta. Broughton offered to resign half of his professional income (£2500) to support a second See, "an instance of self-devotion," said a contemporary writer, "with scarcely a parallel." The Government accepted only £500 a year from him.

Broughton was promptly made a member of both the colony's Legislative Council and Executive Council, assisting the Governor in the administration. He ceased to be a member of the Legislative Council when it was changed to a partially elected body in 1843, but remained a member of the Executive Council until 1849. He was also in charge of the commission for the overall policy towards Tasmanian natives which continued the policy of bounties and roving parties. He was granted a leave of absence and returned to England in 1834, there championing the cause of the church. The result was not as he expected; the Diocese of Australia was to be formed. He was consecrated a bishop by William Howley, Archbishop of Canterbury, at Lambeth Palace Chapel on 14 February 1836 and enthroned Bishop of Australia, on 5 June 1836, in St James' Church, Sydney (Pro-Cathedral), as leader of the new Diocese of Australia just days after his arrival from England.

Due to Broughton’s appeals for clergy to serve in New South Wales, William Sowerby arrived in Sydney in 1837, immediately becoming the first Anglican clergyman at Goulburn. 
In 1838, Broughton visited the Bay of Islands, New Zealand, on M.S. Pelorus, for a pastoral visit to the native church established by the Church Missionary Society among the Māori. Broughton had a controversy with Charles Beaumont Howard over Howard's jurisdiction in South Australia. Broughton was a busy bishop and travelled widely, perhaps more so after his wife died in 1848.

After his diocese was divided in 1847, Broughton was (re-)installed as Bishop of Sydney at St Andrew's Cathedral, Sydney on 26 January 1848.

Broughton traveled to England in late 1852 and was involved in administration and missionary fund raising. He died in Belgravia, City of Westminster (in what is now Greater London) in February 1853 and is buried in Canterbury Cathedral.

Legacy

In 1842 the Diocese of Tasmania was created; in 1847 the diocese was divided further to form four dioceses, Sydney (which Broughton retained), Adelaide, Newcastle and Melbourne.

Broughton is widely accepted as the founder of the King's School in Parramatta, then a town at a distance of a day's ride from Sydney.

Broughton made many journeys around the fledgling colony and is credited as instigating the building of many churches in places such as Newcastle and the Hunter Region north of Sydney and in the Monaro region inland to the south-west.

Broughton championed the Newcastle case and forfeited 500 pounds sterling from his salary to partly fund the development of a new diocese.

The building of St Andrew's Cathedral, Sydney was commenced during the late 1840s.

On 12 March 1845, he consecrated St John the Baptist Church at what later became the site of the federal capital of Australia, Canberra.

A portrait of Broughton, by Marshall Claxton, is held at St Paul's College, Sydney.

The Broughton River and Port Broughton in South Australia and Broughton Streets in Kirribilli, Concord, Canterbury, Camden and Campbelltown are all named after him.

Broughton is commemorated in the Australian Anglican calendar on 20 February. The Anglican Church of Canada commemorates him on 6 June, on which day he is celebrated for his efforts to form an autonomous synod of bishops and set up a truly independent Province within the Anglican communion, laying the groundwork for the synodical form of government that has become one of the hallmarks of modern Anglicanism.

Family
Broughton also consecrated St Mary on Allyn, Allynbrooke, in the Hunter Valley. William Barker Boydell married his daughter Mary Phoebe Broughton and Broughton ordered that a church be built for his daughter to worship in. Boydell and Mary Broughton are both buried at St Mary on Allyn, along with their son, Henry, who died when he was one year old. Another son, Charles Broughton Boydell, married Rose Madelaine, the daughter of William Munnings Arnold and grand-daughter of the first incumbent of Paterson, NSW, John Jennings Smith. William's elder brother, Charles, married into the prominent Blaxland family through John Blaxland's granddaughter, Elizabeth.

See also
 Anglican Church of Australia

References

Further reading

 Michael Gladwin (2015) Anglican clergy in Australia 1788-1850: building a British world, Royal Historical Society, London. 
 G.P. Shaw (1978) Patriarch and Patriot: William Grant Broughton, 1788-1853, colonial statesman and ecclesiastic, Melbourne University Press, Melbourne. 
 Fred T. Whitington (1936) William Grant Broughton, Bishop of Australia: with some account of the earliest Australian clergy Sydney

External links

 Bibliographic directory on Broughton from Project Canterbury
Henry Bailey, Bishop Broughton of Australia (1891)
Christ Church Cathedral, Newcastle - History
Christ Church - Cooma, Monaro district
1850 - Parish of Albury, New South Wales
Heraldic legacy - stars in Crest of the Bishop to the Australian Defence Force
 Two sermons preached in the church of St. James, at Sydney (1837)

People educated at Queen Elizabeth's Grammar School for Boys
Anglican bishops of Sydney
Alumni of Pembroke College, Cambridge
Anglican bishops of Australia
People educated at The King's School, Canterbury
People from Westminster
Australian Anglican priests
1788 births
1853 deaths
Members of the New South Wales Legislative Council
19th-century Australian politicians